Tom Kazas (born 1965 in Sydney, Australia) is a composer/songwriter, record producer/sound engineer, film maker, broadcast operator and a post-utopian.

He was the singer, guitarist, songwriter/composer of the Australian psychedelic rock group The Moffs (band) (1984–1989), that garnered international underground attention in 1985 with their song "Another Day in the Sun".

He continues to produce varied music from rock (Sisyphus Happy) to ambience (Verdigris) to experimental electronica (Argot).

He has composed for theatre, including the 1999 staging of "The Wound", directed by Lex Marinos.

He was the composer and arranger for the Greek Jazz band Xitzaz.

He has produced albums for T J Eckleberg, Magic Lunchbox, Metabass'n'Breath, Tiny Tim, and You Am I.

He composed the soundtrack for "The Ifs of Language", a short film by Peter Lyssiotis and Michael Karris which was a finalist in the 2002 Dendy Short Film Festival.

He has made several music videos and short films, including the 2009 16 minute cinema poem 'The Topologist'.

Discography

Solo albums

 Deliquesence  1989  (Third Eye Records)
 Book of Saturday 1993 (Saturday Records)
 Tom Kazas 1995 (Ravenswood Records)
 Saint or Fool 1997 (Hitch Hyke Records)
 Telemetry 2003  (TKMusic)
 Fleeting Eternities 2006  (TKMusic)
 Verdigris 2011 (TKMusic)
 Melbn Pyxis ep 2012 (TKMusic)
 Sisyphus Happy ep 2013 (TKMusic)
 Manoeuvres 1995-2005 2015 (TKMusic)
 Argot 2017 (TKMusic)
 Love, They Said, With Their Backs To The Precipice 2019 (TKMusic)

Compilation Contributions
 The Thing: From Another World vol. 3' CD 16th Issue 1996 Athens
 Revolution in a Room: CD37 Audio World Magazine 1997 Athens 
 Floralia 3 1998 Italy/Netherlands (Mizmaze/WoT4 Records)

Collaborations
 Bob Armstrong and the Navigators 1990 (Ravenswood Records)
 In A Sea With by Taj Orange  1991
 Shift the Teli by the Ducers 1996
 The Wound by Tom Kazas and Others 1999 (Sidetrack Theatre)
 Turbulence by Xitzaz  1999
 Something Like An Emergency with Josephine Scicluna 2010
 Conversation in an Air Raid Shelter with Josephine Scicluna 2013

With "The Moffs"
 Another Day in the Sun  1985
 Flowers  1986
 The Moffs 1986
 The Traveller  1987
 Labyrinth 1988
 Psychedelicatessen 1994
 The Moffs: The Collection  2008 
 A Young Person's Guide  2018
 Trails  2018

Filmography
 Traces 9 mins  2002
 The Topologist 16 mins  2009 
 The Room 2 mins 2009
 Post Utopian Pause 5 mins 2009
 Collection of Cuts 7 mins 2012
 Transfusion [TJ Eckleberg Remix] 6 mins 2014
 Condenser 4 mins 2018

References

External links
 Tom Kazas Website

Australian male composers
Australian composers
Living people
1965 births